Bárbara Goenaga Bilbao (born 20 July 1983) is a Spanish actress from the Basque Country. She was nominated to the Goya Award for Best New Actress for her performance in 2007 comedy-drama film Oviedo Express.

Biography
Barbara Goenaga was born in San Sebastian, Gipuzkoa, on 20 July 1983. She is daughter of painter  and the niece of actress, writer and film director Aizpea Goenaga. She started her acting career in her homeland, appearing in series like Bai Horixe!, Beni eta Marini and Duplex along with her aunt Aizpea Goenaga. In 1994, she started working in long-running, popular Basque language television soap opera Goenkale where she spent six years interpreting Ainhoa.

She moved to Madrid at age 16, where she participated in series like El Comisario. She also featured in the series El grupo. In 1992 she made her feature film debut in Arantxa Lazkano's Urte ilunak. From year 2000 onwards, she featured in many projects, both in cinema and television: Silvia's Gift (2002), directed by Dionisio Pérez, Amor en defensa propia (2004), by Rafa Russo, La luna en botella (2006) under the direction of Grojo or Oviedo Express (2007), directed by Gonzalo Suárez. In television, she has taken part of popular series like Vientos de agua, At the Edge of the Law (2005) or A medias (2002).

In 2008, her work in Oviedo Express nominated her for a Goya Award in the category Best New Actress.

She had a son from her relation with actor Óscar Jaenada. She has had two children with politician Borja Sémper.

Filmography

Film

Television

References

External links

Spanish film actresses
Actresses from the Basque Country (autonomous community)
People from San Sebastián
1983 births
Spanish television actresses
Living people
20th-century Spanish actresses
21st-century Spanish actresses
Basque-language actors